Asunafo South is one of the constituencies represented in the Parliament of Ghana. It elects one Member of Parliament (MP) by the first past the post system of election. Eric Opoku is the member of parliament for the constituency. He was elected  on the ticket of the National Democratic Congress (NDC).

See also
List of Ghana Parliament constituencies

References 

Parliamentary constituencies in Ahafo Region